Gymnázium Vrútky is a four-year, co-educational gymnasium in Vrútky, Slovakia. In the Slovak educational system, gymnáziums are secondary or high schools which prepare students for university study. Over 85% of students who attend Gymnázium Vrútky attend university.

References
 http://www.gvrutky.edu.sk/
 http://gymvrutky.edupage.org/

Gymnasiums in Slovakia
Education in Slovakia
Schools in Slovakia